Roddy the Roadman is a series of six children's books by British author Phyllis Arkle. Roddy is the workman depicted on the "roadworks ahead" traffic warning sign on British roads; in the stories he comes alive and has numerous adventures.

The first book in the series was published in 1970.

Titles
Roddy the Roadman (1970)

Roddy and the Rustlers (1972)

Roddy on the Motorway (1974)

Roddy on the Canal (1975)

Roddy and the Puma (1979)

Roddy and the Miniature Railway (1980)

External links
 British Library

Series of children's books
Children's fiction books
1970 children's books
British picture books